Faulensee railway station is a closed railway station in the municipality of Spiez, in the Swiss canton of Bern. It is an intermediate stop on the Lake Thun line. Direct rail service ended with the 2020 timetable change and was replaced with regular bus service between Spiez and Interlaken.

References

External links 
 
 

Railway stations in the canton of Bern
BLS railway stations
Disused railway stations in Switzerland